Šenkovec is a naselje (settlement) in the municipality of Brdovec, Zagreb County, Croatia.

References 

Populated places in Zagreb County